George Maxwell Alagiah  ( born 22 November 1955) is a British newsreader, journalist and television news presenter.

Since 3 December 2007, he has been the presenter of the BBC News at Six and was previously the main presenter of GMT on BBC World News since its launch on 1 February 2010.

Background 
Alagiah was born in Colombo, Ceylon on 22 November 1955. His parents, Donald Alagiah, an engineer, and Therese, were Sri Lankan Tamil. In 1961, his parents moved to Ghana in West Africa, where he had his primary education at Christ the King International School. He has four sisters. His secondary education took place at St John's College, an independent Roman Catholic school in Portsmouth, England, after which he read politics at Van Mildert College, Durham University. Whilst at Durham, he wrote for and became editor of the student newspaper Palatinate and was a sabbatical officer of Durham Students' Union.

In 2004, he returned to his grandfather's original home in Sri Lanka in the aftermath of the Asian tsunami to survey the damage. The family's former home had been destroyed, but he was able to recognise an old well where he had played with his sisters, although the well was unsalvageable.

Broadcasting career 
Alagiah joined the BBC in 1989 after seven years in print journalism with South Magazine. Before becoming a presenter, he was Developing World correspondent, based in London, and then Southern Africa correspondent in Johannesburg. As one of the BBC's leading foreign correspondents, he reported on events ranging from the genocide in Rwanda to the plight of the Marsh Arabs in southern Iraq to the civil wars in Afghanistan, Liberia, Sierra Leone and Somalia.

He was the presenter of BBC Four News from its launch in 2002; the programme was later relaunched as The World and then another edition of World News Today. In January 2003 he joined the BBC Six O'Clock News, which he co-presented with Sophie Raworth until October 2005, and with Natasha Kaplinsky until October 2007. Since 3 December 2007, he has been the sole presenter of the Six O'Clock News. Prior to that, he had been the deputy anchor of the BBC One O'Clock News and BBC Nine O'Clock News from 1999. Since 3 July 2006, he has presented World News Today on BBC World News and BBC Two, which was rebranded GMT on 1 February 2010. He last appeared on the programme in 2014. He was formerly a relief presenter on BBC News at Ten, presenting mainly Monday to Thursday when main presenters Huw Edwards and Fiona Bruce were unavailable.

A specialist on Africa and the developing world, Alagiah has interviewed, among others, Nelson Mandela, Archbishop Desmond Tutu, former Secretary-General of the United Nations Kofi Annan and President Robert Mugabe of Zimbabwe. His other documentaries and features include reports on why affirmative action in America is a 'Lost Cause', for the Assignment programme, Saddam Hussein's genocidal campaign against the Kurds of northern Iraq for the BBC's Newsnight programme and a report on the last reunion of the veterans of Dunkirk.

Awards and interests 
In 2000, Alagiah was part of the BBC team which collected a BAFTA award for its coverage of the Kosovo conflict. He has won numerous awards including Best International Report at the Royal Television Society in 1993 and in 1994 was the overall winner of the Amnesty International UK Media Awards. He was appointed Officer of the Order of the British Empire (OBE) in the 2008 New Year Honours.

His appearances at literary festivals include Cheltenham, Keswick, Hay-on-Wye and London, and he has spoken at the Royal Geographical Society, the Royal Society of Arts and at the Royal Overseas League. He is on the Board of the Royal Shakespeare Company.

From 2002 to 2009, Alagiah was a patron of the Fairtrade Foundation from which in July 2009, he was obliged to resign by BBC Management who claimed professional conflict of interest. Complaints were received at the BBC from members of the public who were unhappy that Alagiah had been asked to step down. The BBC responded that in keeping with its principles of impartiality, it would be inappropriate for one of its leading journalists to be seen supporting a movement that clearly represents a controversial view of global trade. He has also been actively involved in supporting microfinance as a tool for development, including recent appearances in support of Opportunity International. He has been a patron of Parenting UK since 2000.

In 2010, he received the Outstanding Achievement in Television award at the Asian Awards.

In 2020, his debut novel The Burning Land was shortlisted for a Society of Authors' award. The book is described as a "gripping, pacy thriller about corruption and homicide in South Africa".

Personal life 
He is married to Frances Robathan, whom he met at Durham University. The couple have two children, Adam and Matthew. He lives in Stoke Newington, North London.

On 17 April 2014, it was announced that Alagiah was being treated for colorectal cancer. A statement from the BBC said: "He is grateful for all the good wishes he has received thus far and is optimistic for a positive outcome." On 28 June, Alagiah announced on Twitter that he was making "encouraging progress". In late October 2015 he announced on Twitter that the treatment was officially over, and he returned to the BBC on 10 November. In January 2018 it emerged that the cancer had returned and he would undergo further treatment.

In March 2018, in an interview with The Sunday Times, Alagiah noted that his cancer was terminal and could have been caught earlier if the screening programme in England, which is automatically offered from the age of 60, was the same as that in Scotland, where it is automatically offered from the age of 50. 

In June 2020 Alagiah said that the cancer had spread to his lungs, liver and lymph nodes, but was not at a "chronic" or "terminal" stage. In October 2022, Alagiah announced that his cancer had spread further and he took a break from TV to undergo a new series of treatment.

References

External links 
 
 Profile from BBC Newswatch
 Career (from World People's Blog) 
 BBC World: George Alagiah joins BBC World to present new peak-time news programme

1955 births
Living people
Alumni of Van Mildert College, Durham
BBC World News
BBC newsreaders and journalists
British people of Sri Lankan Tamil descent
British reporters and correspondents
British television presenters
Officers of the Order of the British Empire
People educated at St John's College, Portsmouth
People from Colombo
Sri Lankan emigrants to the United Kingdom